Nyctemera evergista is a moth of the family Erebidae first described by Stoll in 1781. It is found on the Moluccas, Seram, Buru and in New Guinea.

Subspecies
Nyctemera evergista evergista (Seram, Buru, Moluccas: Ambon, Lease Island)
Nyctemera evergista agagles (Boisduval, 1932) (Irian-Jaya)
Nyctemera evergista bismarckiana de Vos, 2002 (Papua New Guinea, Bismarck Archipelago, New Britain, New Ireland, New Hanover, Umboi Island)
Nyctemera evergista uniplaga (Swinhoe, 1903) (north-eastern Irian Jaya, Papua New Guinea to Milne Bay, D'Entrecasteaux Islands)

References

Nyctemerina
Moths described in 1781